Jennifer, Jenny, Jennie, or Jen Adams or Addams may refer to:

Jennifer M. Adams, American diplomat
Jen Adams (born 1980), American lacrosse player and coach
Jennie Adams (born 1963), Australian romance writer
Jenny Adams (born 1978), American track and field athlete
Jenny Addams (1909–1980), Belgian fencer